Fabrice Piazzini (born 9 November 1965) was a Swiss ski jumper who competed from 1984 to 1989. He finished eighth in the team large hill at the 1988 Winter Olympics in Calgary.

Piazzini's best career finish was seventh in a normal hill event in Yugoslavia in 1984.

External links

Ski jumpers at the 1984 Winter Olympics
Ski jumpers at the 1988 Winter Olympics
Olympic ski jumpers of Switzerland
Living people
Swiss male ski jumpers
1965 births
Place of birth missing (living people)
20th-century Swiss people